Alastair Mullis, LLB (London) LLM (Cantab), is Professor of Law and Head of the Law School at the University of Leeds.

Biography
He taught at King's College London from 1989–1999, where in 1996 he was appointed senior lecturer. He joined the University of East Anglia in 1999 and became Dean in September 2001 and Professor in 2005. Alastair Mullis has also held visiting appointments in the United States (he was a Visiting Professor at the University of Detroit from 1993–1995 and has held adjunct posts at the Universities of Detroit and Pepperdine), Germany and Tunisia. Alastair Mullis is one of the specialist editors for Butterworths, Law of Tort and writes (with Donal Nolan) the annual review of tort cases for the All England Law Reports, Annual Review.

In 2010, Alastair Mullis became heavily involved in the public debate on libel reform in the UK, following the publication of a research paper co-authored with Dr Andrew Scott of the London School of Economics and Political Science. The paper responded to 10 recommendations made by the Libel Reform Campaign. It emphasised that any reforms must be evidence-based, and that personal and public interests in the protection of privacy and reputation should not be overlooked.

Bibliography
 Torts (3rd edn Macmillan, 2003) (with K Oliphant).
 The CISG: A New Textbook for Students and Practitioners (Sellier 2007) (with P Huber)

References

External links
 Website at Leeds

Academics of King's College London
Academics of the University of East Anglia
Alumni of the University of Cambridge
British legal scholars
Living people
Academics of the University of Leeds
Year of birth missing (living people)